The Icacos River, sometimes spelled Hicacos, is a river of Naguabo, Puerto Rico. This river aids the hydroelectric dam in Naguabo.

Río Icacos National Wild and Scenic River 
The Icacos River has been designated a National Wild and Scenic River since 2009. The river is located within El Yunque National Forest and El Toro Wilderness, and it has some of the most varied terrain of any of the forest rivers. 

The Icacos River flows into a three-river junction (together with the Cubuy and Prieto Rivers) through a series of waterfalls often called the Icacos Falls or Cubuy Falls, also located within the municipality of Naguabo. This is the source of the Blanco River which flows southeast towards the Caribbean Sea in Río barrio, Naguabo.

Gallery

See also 
 List of rivers of Puerto Rico
 Cayo Icacos

References

External links 
 USGS Hydrologic Unit Map – Caribbean Region (1974)
 Rios de Puerto Rico

Rivers of Puerto Rico
Wild and Scenic Rivers of the United States
2002 establishments in Puerto Rico
Protected areas established in 2002
Naguabo, Puerto Rico